Maria Sorana Ceplinschi (born 12 August 2005) is a Romanian artistic gymnast.

Career

Junior 
At the 2019 Romanian Junior Championships, Ceplinschi won silver medals on both vault and floor exercise, and she finished fourth in the all-around. Then at the Senior Romanian Championships, she finished twelfth in the all-around, fifth on vault, and seventh on floor exercise. Then at the Horizon Cup, Ceplinschi won gold medals on every event except for the vault.

At the 2020 Romanian Championships, Ceplinschi only competed on vault and uneven bars, and she finished fourth in both event finals. She competed at the 2020 Junior European Championships, and the Romanian team won the gold medal by more than ten points ahead of Ukraine and Hungary. Individually, Ceplinschi won the silver medal in the all-around and on the floor exercise, both behind her teammate Ana Bărbosu.

Senior 
Ceplinschi made her senior international debut at the 2021 European Championships. She was initially the first reserve for the floor exercise event final, but when Larisa Iordache withdrew due to health issues, Ceplinschi was added. She finished fifth with a score of 12.966. At the Mersin Challenge Cup, she won the gold medal on both the balance beam and the floor exercise. She competed at the 2021 World Artistic Gymnastics Championships and qualified for the all-around and floor finals. She finished 16th in the all-around and 6th on floor.

Competitive history

References

External links 

2005 births
Living people
Romanian female artistic gymnasts
Sportspeople from Constanța
21st-century Romanian women